Dabrun is a village and a former municipality in Wittenberg district in Saxony-Anhalt, Germany. Since 1 January 2010, it is part of the town Kemberg.

Geography 
Dabrun lies about 8 km southeast of Lutherstadt Wittenberg on the Elbe. The community belongs to the administrative community (Verwaltungsgemeinschaft) of Kemberg whose seat is in the town of Kemberg.

Subdivisions
Dabrun has three subdivisions:
Melzwig
Boos
Rötzsch and the residential area of Dabruner Weinberg

History 
Dabrun had its first documentary mention in 1353 under the name Dobrunn.

Buildings 
The brick church was built in 1897.

Sport 
football SG Dabrun/Rackith Kreisliga Wittenberg

Regular arrangements 
 woman- und man-fastnacht (alternately). January
 youth-fastnacht (since 1936). March
carnival associations in the neighbourhood
 Wartenburg. CCW
 Trebitz. TCV 
 Kemberg. Karnevalsclub Kemberg
 Lutherstadt Wittenberg. GWK

Economy and transportation
Federal Highway (Bundesstraße) B 2 between Wittenberg and Bad Düben is 6 km away.

External links 
Dabrun's website
Administrative community's website

Former municipalities in Saxony-Anhalt
Kemberg